Symphonies of Sickness is the second album by British extreme metal band Carcass. It was released through Earache Records on 4 December 1989.

Until 2013's Surgical Steel, this album marked the last time the band had recorded as a three-piece.

Musical style
With Symphonies of Sickness, Carcass kept the grindcore sound of Reek of Putrefaction, and added a death metal style.

Reception
Ned Raggett of Allmusic gave Symphonies of Sickness a four star review praising the album's depth in comparison to its predecessor Reek of Putrefaction. Raggett singled out "Exhume to Consume" as the main highlight of Symphonies of Sickness and called it an all-time Carcass number. Greg Pratt of Decibel ranked the ten tracks from Symphonies of Sickness and picked "Exhume to Consume" as the best track from the album calling it a classic death metal cut.

Legacy
Symphonies of Sickness is now considered a landmark in the deathgrind sub-genre of heavy metal music. In December 2018, it became the third Carcass album to be inducted into the Decibel Hall of Fame; the first two being Necroticism - Descanting the Insalubrious and Heartwork respectively. This accolade would reward 50% of the band's full-length discography a Hall of Fame entry. In the same year, Loudwire's Eduardo Rivadavia named Symphonies of Sickness as the best goregrind album ever made. In February 2009, Symphonies of Sickness was ranked number 4 in Terrorizer'''s list of essential European grindcore albums.

Releases
The original CD release contained 16 bonus tracks taken from the Reek of Putrefaction album. Some editions also contain "Genital Grinder II" and "Hepatic Tissue Fermentation" from the Pathological compilation. The album was reissued in 1996 with a censored outer cover proclaiming "Original artwork contained inside". It was later reissued in 2008, as part of reissuing of all of Carcass's albums to tie in with their reunion. This version included the Symphonies of Sickness demo as bonus tracks on one side of a dualdisc, while the DVD side featured the second part of an extended documentary titled The Pathologist's Report Part II: Propagation. Later editions of this reissue contain the songs on a CD and the documentary on a separate DVD. This reissue was presented in a 12-panel digipak with full lyrics and artwork.

Cover artwork variations
A limited edition (featuring the "gore" cover artwork) was once released containing 16 bonus tracks taken from the Reek of Putrefaction'' album. The total running time of this version is 76:58.
The original "gore" cover, which was later banned and replaced by a "clean" cover, was drawings of a human similar to those found in biology books. The exact same cover was used for "Reek of Putrefaction" except with a different color scheme. In 2002/2003 the gore covers were restored.

Track listing

Personnel
 Jeff Walker – bass, lead vocals
 Bill Steer – guitars, co-lead vocals
 Ken Owen – drums, backing vocals

Charts

References

External links
 Symphonies of Sickness on Discogs
 Symphonies of Sickness on Bandcamp

Earache Records albums
Carcass (band) albums
1989 albums
Combat Records albums